Janet Tamaro is an American television writer, series creator, executive producer, and showrunner.

Biography
Tamaro began her career as an on-camera television correspondent.  She worked for ABC NEWSOne, Inside Edition, and the Travel Channel as a correspondent and host. Tamaro is the author of the book So That's What They're For!: Breastfeeding Basics, originally published in 1998.

Tamaro has written for many television series, including Law & Order: Special Victims Unit, Line of Fire, CSI: NY, Lost, Bones, Sleeper Cell, and Trauma.  Tamaro worked as a freelance writer for the first season of Lost in 2004. Tamaro and the Lost writing staff won the Writers Guild of America award for Best Dramatic Series at the February 2006 ceremony for their work on the first and second seasons. Tamaro was also nominated for an Emmy Award for her work on Sleeper Cell.

In 2010, Tamaro created the TNT television series Rizzoli & Isles, which was inspired by the crime novels written by Tess Gerritsen. The series has been a hit for TNT for seven seasons and has sold into worldwide syndication.

Tamaro has earned a Gracie Allen Award the Alliance for Women in Media Foundation, a Women's Image Network (WIN) Award, and Prevention magazine's Healthy TV Award for her work on the show. She was named as one of the top 50 showrunners in the Hollywood Reporter 2010, 2011, and 2012.  She is featured in the documentary SHOWRUNNERS: The Art of Running a TV Show. She sits on the advisory board of WeForShe, a media advocacy group that strives to find practical ways to bring about a gender-balanced landscape in television.

Janet Tamaro did her undergraduate study at UC Berkeley and later earned a master's degree in journalism at Columbia University. She is married and has two daughters.

References

External links 

Janet Tamaro Twitter
Top 50 Power Show Runners article (alpha listing) The Hollywood Reporter
Showrunner profile piece in The Hollywood Reporter
Review of R&I pilot, The Hollywood Reporter
Story about R&I during Season 2, The Times-Picayune, New Orleans
Digitalspy.com story about JT moving on for new opportunities
Storywise Podcast episode featuring Janet Tamaro
The Women's Eye Podcast episode featuring Janet Tamaro
We For She homepage

Showrunners
American television producers
American women television producers
American television writers
Place of birth missing (living people)
Year of birth missing (living people)
Living people
American women television writers
Writers Guild of America Award winners
21st-century American women